Threeway is an unincorporated community in Westmoreland County, in the U. S. state of Virginia. Located at the junction of routes 203 and 620, it was previously the site of a post office and was known as Cary's Corner in the 19th century.

References

GNIS entry

Unincorporated communities in Virginia
Unincorporated communities in Westmoreland County, Virginia